, commonly known as JAL Infotec also in English, is a Japanese company headquartered in Tokyo, Japan, that offers IT services.

Overview
Originally, in 1978, JAL Information Technology Co., Ltd. (JAL Infotec) was established by Japan Airlines Co., Ltd.
In 2001, IBM Japan started outsourcing services regarding JAL Infotec, and then in 2002, IBM Japan got the majority (51%) of JAL Infotec from Japan Airlines. 
In 2011, Japan Airlines bought back the majority of JAL Infotec from IBM Japan, for reducing the outsourcing costs, as one step of the restructuring of the JAL group. 

The company offers the services of system integration, cloud computing, and information security, and provides computer software within the JAL group.

See also
 List of companies of Japan

References

External links
 Official website

Cloud computing providers 
Computer security companies 
Information technology consulting firms of Japan
Japan Airlines 
Service companies based in Tokyo 
Software companies established in 1978
Japanese companies established in 1978